Yagüe Club de Fútbol is a Spanish football team based in the Yagüe neighborhood of Logroño.  The club was founded in 1962. The team currently plays in the Tercera División – Group 16 in Group 16, where it has played for six seasons. The current coach is Javier De Pedro. 

A new ground is being constructed for the team to play at the local high school, El Colegio Juan Yagüe.

Season to season

13 seasons in Tercera División

References

External links
Official site (Spanish)
frfutbol.com profile

Association football clubs established in 1962
Football clubs in La Rioja (Spain)
Sport in Logroño
1962 establishments in Spain